Artigisa is a genus of moths of the family Noctuidae. This genus was first described by Francis Walker in 1863.

Species
 Artigisa acrospila (Turner, 1906)
 Artigisa byrsopa Lower, 1903
 Artigisa catenata (Moore, 1887)
 Artigisa dentilinea Turner, 1909
 Artigisa impropria Walker, 1865
 Artigisa lignicolaria Walker, 1866
 Artigisa melanephele Hampson, 1914
 Artigisa nigrosignata Walker, [1863]
 Artigisa terminalis Hampson, 1914

References

 Artigisa at Markku Savela's Lepidoptera and Some Other Life Forms
 Natural History Museum Lepidoptera genus database

Catocalinae
Moth genera
Taxa named by Francis Walker (entomologist)